Gareth Hock (born Gareth Charnock; 5 September 1983) is an English former professional rugby league footballer who played as a  or  for the Leigh Centurions in the Betfred Championship. He has represented Great Britain and England at international level.

Early life
Wigan-born Gareth Charnock joined Wigan's scholarship scheme from St Jude's, a local amateur team. He changed his surname after his parents separated.

2000s
Hock gained international experience playing in the Great Britain Academy side that toured Australia in 2001. He worked his way up through the Wigan Warriors' scholarship and Academy systems, playing in the Academy Under-19s team during the 2002 season. However, injury forced him to miss much of the latter part of the year. He was also called up to the England Academy squad to face the Aussie Schoolboys in December 2002. He played in the first Test, scoring a vital try in England's historic victory. He had achieved amateur representative honours, touring with Great Britain U16s and U18s.

He was included in the Wigan Warriors' 2003 first team squad by head coach Stuart Raper. Gareth made his first team début that season against Doncaster in the Challenge Cup, scoring two tries after coming on as a substitute. He went on to become a first team regular for the rest of 2003's Super League VIII. Gareth commented later: "Mick Cassidy was injured early, which was a lucky break for me," he said. "It went well, then Faz (Farrell) got injured and I got a few starts. I’ve enjoyed every minute." He was included in the England A squad to face the Australians at Griffin Park, Brentford on 28 October 2003.

He crowned a magnificent season by being named Super League Young Player of the Year. Hock played for the Wigan Warriors from the interchange bench in the 2003 Super League Grand Final which was lost to Bradford Bulls.

Hock signed a new one-year contract with the Wigan Warriors in June 2004. His playing career took a turn for the worse when he picked up a medial cruciate ligament (MCL) knee injury against the Bradford Bulls on 25 February 2005. The injury required a full knee reconstruction which kept him side-lined until the end of the 2005's Super League X. Gareth was expected to make his return in 2006's Super League XI but suffered a stress fracture to his shin and had to miss the start of 2006's Super League XI.

On 19 May 2006 Hock made his long-awaited return to rugby league in the Wigan Warriors' Rugby League Challenge Cup match against the Salford City Reds which the Wigan Warriors lost 4-16, despite being on the losing team Hock made an impressive return. He featured in the next match which was against rivals St. Helens, he was again impressive and scored a try but the Wigan Warriors lost 14–28. His impressive return has meant that Hock is likely to be included in the Great Britain test squad to take on New Zealand only a month after returning from a 2-year injury.

In September 2008, he was named in the England training squad for the 2008 Rugby League World Cup, and in October 2008 he was named in the final 24-man England squad. He was named in the England team to face Wales at the Keepmoat Stadium, Doncaster, before England's departure for the 2008 Rugby League World Cup. He went with the England squad to compete in the 2008 Rugby League World Cup tournament in Australia.

In June 2009, he tested positive for cocaine following tests on an 'A' sample of urine taken during a match between the Wigan Warriors and the Salford City Reds. A second 'B' sample also returned a positive result for benzoylecgonine, the main metabolite of cocaine. In August 2009, it was confirmed that Hock would face a two-year ban from rugby league as he did not appeal against the mandatory ban.

2010s
On 10 May 2011, Gareth Hock signed a new contract with Wigan until 2015, beginning once his 2-year doping ban has ended on 23 June.
He made a high-profile return against Huddersfield in a 2011 Super League game.

Since his return from his ban, he was a consistent member of the Wigan first team, gaining the number 12 jersey in the 2012 season (following the departure of Joel Tomkins to Saracens RUFC). Hock is well known for his aggressive and confrontational style of play and has begun to return to the high standard performances seen before his ban.

On 22 January 2013, Wigan announced that Hock would be joining Widnes on a season-long loan.
After a possible move to NRL side Parramatta Eels fell through, on 5 September 2013 Salford announced he would be signing for them for the 2014 Super League season on a 4-year deal.

On 22 October 2013, England Rugby League issued the following statement: "As a result of serious breaches of team discipline that have fallen below the strict code of conduct as agreed by team management, Gareth Hock has been withdrawn from the England Rugby League World Cup squad with immediate effect. He is replaced by Huddersfield player Brett Ferres. There will be no further comment issued by England Rugby League on this matter."

In 2015 Gareth moved to play for Leigh in the Kingstone Press Championship. He made his début in a comfortable 54–6 victory over Workington Town.

In January 2018 he joined Featherstone Rovers on a one-year deal. In August 2018 Featherstone Rovers terminated his contract. On 23 October 2018 he joined Barrow Raiders.

In May 2019, following his release from Barrow, Hock re-joined Leigh Centurions. However, in July, he announced his retirement from rugby league with immediate effect.

References

External links 
Featherstone Rovers profile
Leigh Centurions profile
Gareth Hock Statistics at wigan.rlfans.com

1983 births
Living people
Barrow Raiders players
Doping cases in rugby league
English rugby league players
England national rugby league team players
Featherstone Rovers players
Great Britain national rugby league team players
Leigh Leopards players
Rugby league second-rows
Rugby league players from Wigan
Salford Red Devils players
Widnes Vikings players
Wigan Warriors players